Tramell Tillman (born June 17, 1985) is an American actor. He is known for his role as Seth Milchick in the Apple TV+ series Severance (2022–).

Personal life
Tillman grew up in Largo, Maryland, in the Washington metropolitan area, and is the youngest of six kids. After graduating from Eleanor Roosevelt High School in 2003, he enrolled at Xavier University of Louisiana to study to become an orthopedic surgeon. However, he did not enjoy the course work. In 2005, after Hurricane Katrina hit New Orleans, he transferred to Jackson State University, where he changed his major.

Tillman graduated from Jackson State with a Bachelor of Science in Mass Communications in 2008, summa cum laude, and a Masters of Fine Arts from the University of Tennessee in 2014, and was the first African American man to graduate from that program.

Tillman credits his mother for inspiring him to go into acting to overcome his shyness.

Acting

Theatre

Television

References

External links 
 

21st-century American actors
1985 births
African-American male actors
American male television actors
Jackson State University alumni
Living people
People from Largo, Maryland
University of Tennessee alumni